Liberty Corner may refer to:

Places
United States
Liberty Corners, Wisconsin
Liberty Corner, New Jersey